The Mahnfeldt House (Danish: Mahnfeldts Gård) is a listed property fronting the Nyhavn canal in Copenhagen, Denmark. It takes its name after the company E. Mahnfeldt, which was based at the site from 1852 to 1942.

History

Early history

17th and 18th centuries

The site was originally part of a much larger property. This property was listed in Copenhagen's first cadastre of 1689 as No. 20 in St. Ann's East Quarter and owned by judge Henrik Ehlers. It was later divided into a number of smaller properties. The present building on the site was constructed in 1739 for grocer (hørkræmmer) Bertil Jegind. The property was listed in the New cadastre of 1756 as No. 33 and belonged to one Nikolaj Godenius' widow at that time.

Brennøe family
The property was in 1769 acquired by Christian Pedersen Brennøe, a manufacturer of ship sails, flags and compasses. At the time of the 1787 census, he resided in the building with his wife Anna Friis, their four children (aged seven to 22), four apprentices (aged 18 to 20) and two maids (aged 20 and 26).

At the time of the 1801 census, No. 33 was home to three households. Christian Brenøe resided in the building with the master sailmaker Peter Brenøe and two apprentices (aged 15 and 20). Peter Grib, a navaql officer with rank of commander captain, resided in the building with his wife Else Marie Svane and two maids. Christian Launs, a grocer (urtekræmmer), resided in the building with his wife Maren K. Pellemand, their two-year-old son Christian S. Launsm an apprentice and a maid.

The property and family business was upon Brennøe's death in 1800 passed to his eldest son Peter Christian Brennøe, He lived there with his wife Olave F. C. Leth and five children until 1819. Their daughter Anna Brennøe (later Anna Nielsen) became a successful actress and  opera singer.  Peter Berg, who took over the business, owned the house for more than forty years. The architect Johan Daniel Herholdt lived in the building from 1847 to 1853.

Peter Berg
At the time of the 1834 census, No. 33 was home to four households. Peter Berg, a manufacturer of sails, flags and compasses, resided on the second floor with his wife Nicoline Marie Juul, their five children (aged 10 to 21), two apprentices, a maid and a lodger.  Nicolaj Nissen, a skipper, resided on the third floor with his wife Christine Bregaard, 	their three children (aged six to 15) and two lodgers. Augost Diedrig Schultz (1677-1862), a captain in the Royal Danish Navym resided on the first floor with his wife Christophine Lovise Holm, their six children (aged seven to 20) and two maids. The eldest son, August Christian Schultz (1813-1008), then a naval lieutenant, would later reach the rank of admiral. Another sonm Johan Philip Schultz (1820-1887), reached the rank of counter admiral. Tea and porcelain merchant Hendrich Clausen	and skipper Stephan Steffensen	 resided with a maid on the ground floor.

Mahnfeldt family
 
Carl Mahnfeldt (1820-), a cooper, took over the building in 1852 and founded a company on 2 December that same year.

Mahnfeldt is not mentioned as a resident of the building at the 1860 census, possibly due to incomplete census records or because he did in fact not acquire the building until after the 1860 census. His building was home to 26 residents in five households at the 1860 census. Christine Christjansen, widow of a skipper, resided in the building withfour of her children (aged 25 to 41) anf the sailors Hans and Johannes Matisen (aged 20 and 22).  Sophie Dorthea Andersen, a widow employed with needlework, resided in the building with her her 10-year-old daughter, Peter Berg (the former owner), three of his daughters (aged 40 to 46) and one maid.  Peter Andreas C. Berg, a sail maker, resided in the building with his wife Wilhelmine Albertine Berg, their two children (aged two and four)m one maid and three aprprentices.  Marie Caroline Koefoed, Antoinette Koefoed	 and Hansine Emilie Koefoedthree sisters aged 42 to 52resided together in another dwelling.  The last household consisted of just one person, Christian Wildenrot Funch, a colonel in his 60s.

In 1873, Mahnfeldt passed the company to his son Ernst Johan Sophus Mahnfeldt (1848-1880). He changed the name of the company to E. Mahnfeldt.

At the time of the 1880 census, Mahnfeldt resided in the building with his wife Emilie Christiane Mahnfeldt (née Mouritsen)m their two daughters (aged one and two) and a maid.	

On Mahnfeldt's death later the same year, the operations was continued by Emilie Christiane Mahnfeldt as E. Mahnfeldt's Enke (E. Mahnfeldt's Widow). In 1914, she passed it to their son Ernst Emil Johan Sophus Mahnfeldt. Pn his death in 1936, it was continued by his widow Gerda Mahnfeldt. In 1942, she passed it to their son Erik E. Mahnfeldt. He moved the company to new premises at Strandlodsvej 11 on Amager but kept the property at Nyhavn 65 at least until 1950.

Architecture

The Mahnfeldt House stands in blank brick over four storeys and is nine bays wide. The three central bays are flanked by two pillars and are tipped by a three-bay wall dormer. Above the gate is a compass rose surrounded by three figures. Below is an hourglass, a Swallowtail flag and a compass. The figure to the left represents Mercury. A seated woman holds a torch in her hand and has flowers in her lap.

Two half-timbered side wings extend from the rear side of the building. The western side wing is in two storeys and dates from some time between 1739 and 1756. The eastern side wing is in three storeys and dates from some time between 1756 and 1801.  The courtyard also contains a half-timbered rear wing and a three-storey, half-timbered warehouse.

Today
The groundfloor of the building is occupied by a restaurant, Kompasset (English: The Compass), which specializes in smørrebrød. A consultancy,  
Mfp Konsulenterne, is also based in the building. It also contains a number of private dwellings.

References

External links

Image
Images
Companies

Listed buildings and structures in Copenhagen
Houses completed in 1739
1739 establishments in Denmark